Pandoraea thiooxydans is a Gram-negative, oxidase-positive, catalase-negative, aerobic, thiosulfate-oxidizing, rod-shaped, motile bacterium with a single polar flagellum, of the genus Pandoraea, isolated from rhizosphere soils of sesame in Junghwa-dong in the Republic of Korea.

References

External links
Type strain of Pandoraea thiooxydans at BacDive -  the Bacterial Diversity Metadatabase

Burkholderiaceae